Tyutin is a Russian surname. Notable people with the surname include:

 Igor Tyutin (born 1940), Russian theoretical physicist
 Fedor Tyutin (born 1983), Russian ice hockey player

Russian-language surnames